Octadecane is an alkane hydrocarbon with the chemical formula CH3(CH2)16CH3.

Properties
Octadecane is distinguished by being the alkane with the lowest carbon number that is unambiguously solid at room temperature and pressure.

References

External links
 Phytochemical and Ethnobotanical Databases

Alkanes